Larry Lee Ranes (born March 22, 1945) and Danny Arthur Ranes (October 20, 1943 – January 29, 2022) are American serial killer brothers who committed their crime sprees predominantly in Kalamazoo, Michigan. Larry, a suspect in the murders of five people in the 1960s, has been sentenced to life imprisonment for one murder in 1964; Danny was convicted of four sexually-motivated murders between March and August 1972 with accomplice Brent Eugene Koster (born October 10, 1956), for which both were sentenced to life imprisonment. Their case is notable for the fact that, unlike other siblings who engage in crime, they operated completely independently of one another.

Biographies 
Danny and Larry were born on October 20, 1943, and March 22, 1945, respectively, in Kalamazoo. Influenced by their father's authoritarian parenting, the two brothers constantly competed with one another, often fighting over a handful of cents, in addition to being persuaded to drink alcoholic beverages. In 1954, their father abandoned the family and moved to Florida, where he found himself a new woman and a job as a gas station attendant. In 1958, the 13-year-old Larry met a 23-year-old female neighbor named Sue, a mother with three children. Over the next few years, he began to spend much of his free time with her and took part in raising her children, eventually beginning an intimate relationship with her. In the early 1960s, both brothers began dating a girl named Kathy from their high school. The impact of dating two different women took a toll on Larry's academic performance, causing him to drop out from 10th grade and turn toward a life of crime. In 1962, he, together with a friend, stole a car, but both were quickly arrested. The district attorney's office, in exchange for nullifying his sentence, offered Larry to enlist in the army, to which he agreed. However, he garnered a negative reputation not long after his enlistment, as he had to be repeatedly disciplined for misconduct and his chronic alcoholism. In the meantime, his brother Danny married Kathy, who later bore him two children. In 1963, Larry attacked a colleague in a drunken stupor, which resulted in his dismissal from the army and eventual return to Kalamazoo. He then repeatedly begged Sue to marry him, but was refused each time. Devastated by her refusals, Larry attempted to commit suicide on December 23, 1963, by trying to suffocate himself by inhaling exhaust fumes from his 1958 Plymouth Plaza, but was saved by a police officer who took him to the Kalamazoo Regional Psychiatric Hospital, where he remained for ten days.

Murder of Gary Smock 
On May 30, 1964, Larry, posing as a hitchhiker, was given a lift by 30-year-old Gary Albert Smock, a Plymouth schoolteacher passing through Kalamazoo. During the trip, Ranes brandished a weapon and forced Smock to leave the car and climb into the trunk, where he subsequently locked him in. While continuing the trip, Smock attempted to get out of the car, after which Ranes stopped the car, tied him up and then shot him twice in the back of the head. He then stole $3 and other items of material values, before leaving the car on the side of road, where it was discovered a few hours later by a police officer.

Over the next few months, Ranes told a number of acquaintances about the murder, due to which he was arrested in the early morning of June 5, 1964 in front of his friend's house. He offered no resistance during his arrest, and readily admitted to killing Smock, with incriminating evidence, such as a watch and shoes, later being identified as belonging to Smock by relatives and friends. When he was taken to the police station, Ranes told police that he had killed four others during hold-ups at various gas stations: he confessed to the May 30 murder of 33-year-old Charles E. Snider in Elkhart, Indiana; the murder of an Air Force serviceman in Paw Paw, Michigan; the murder of a man in Las Vegas, Nevada and another man in Kentucky. Ranes was unable to name three of his victims, but the investigators suspected that one of them might've been 21-year-old Vernon La Benne, a serviceman from Southfield, Michigan. While working at a gas station near Battle Creek, La Benne was shot dead on April 6, 1964, a day before he was due to be married. According to Ranes, he committed all the murders for robbery, and after having consumed all the food and alcohol, he intended to commit suicide, but never went through with it.

Ranes was ordered to undergo a psychiatric evaluation, which declared him insane. The examining doctors concluded that the psychological trauma inflicted on him by his father developed a subconscious hatred towards gas stations in young Larry, as they reminded him of his father.

Ranes' trial began on September 29, 1964. On October 8, by jury verdict, he was found guilty of the murder of Gary Smock, and on October 23, he was sentenced to life imprisonment without parole.

Danny's killing spree 
After his brother's conviction, Danny Ranes began frequently arguing with his wife, as well as demonstrating worsening sexual behavior. In November 1968, he attacked 18-year-old Dorothy King in Battle Creek, taking control of her car at gunpoint. He attempted to drive to the outskirts of town so he could rape her, but King managed to escape when he took a wrong turn near the Kellogg Community College, after which Ranes threw away his gun and fled. Ranes' car was later found in the parking lot of the pharmacy where King worked and was attacked, and after being identified by the victim, Danny Ranes was arrested.

On February 4, 1969, Danny Ranes was found guilty of the felonious assault on Dorothy King, and on April 15, 1969, he was sentenced to three to four years imprisonment. During his imprisonment, his wife divorced him. He was granted parole on February 17, 1972, returned to Kalamazoo and got a job as a gas station operator. During this period, he met 15-year-old vagrant Brent Eugene Koster, a local youth with a troubled family life on account of his schizophrenic mother and alcoholic father. After meeting Koster, Ranes provided him with accommodation in one of his girlfriends' trailers and got him a job. With no other role models in his life, and given his age and Ranes helping him, Koster would later be easily led on into becoming his accomplice.

On July 5, 1972, Ranes and Koster raped and killed 19-year-old Chicagoans Linda Clark and Claudia Bidstrup at a gas station near the I-94, where Ranes was working at the time. After killing them, the pair wrapped the victims' bodies in a blanket and placed them in the back of their car. Koster then drove the car into a wooded area near Galesburg, where he set it on fire to remove potentially incriminating evidence. Clark and Bidstrup's remains were found 14 days later by a passing motorcyclist. On August 5, while driving near the Western Michigan University, Ranes and Koster picked up 18-year-old hitchhiker Pamela Fearnow. Threatening the girl with a knife, they took Fearnow to the woodlands surrounding Morrow Lake, near Comstock Township, where they raped her several times before Ranes strangled her using a plastic bag. Despite Ranes' instructions, Koster revealed his guilt in the murders to several street workers in September, one of whom later turned out to be an informant. Koster was arrested on September 5, 1972, and interrogated, readily admitting his guilt in the killings and implicating Danny Ranes, who was arrested that same evening. During interrogation, Koster also claimed that Danny had confided to him that he had kidnapped, raped and killed 28-year-old Patricia Howk on March 19. Based on Koster's testimony and other incriminating evidence, Ranes was charged with the four murders in October 1972.

At Ranes' trial, Koster acted as a key witness for the prosecution. Ranes was found guilty of first degree murder for killing Fearnow and second degree murder for killing Howk, and sentenced to life without parole on August 9, 1973. He pleaded no contest to second degree murder for killing Clark and Bidstrup, and was given two additional life terms. As part of a plea deal, Koster was charged with second degree murder in the Clark case, to which he pleaded guilty. On July 21, 1975, he was sentenced to life imprisonment with the possibility of parole. The judge told Koster he deserved to die in prison and that people like him were why some people wanted capital punishment brought back to Michigan.

Aftermath 
Following their convictions, the Ranes brothers have been housed in various penitentiary institutions across Michigan. In the early 1970s, following his brother's conviction, Larry officially changed his name to Monk Steppenwolf, in reference to the protagonist of the novel Steppenwolf by German-Swiss author Hermann Hesse, which Ranes had read in 1967. While imprisoned, he maintained contact with his brother's ex-wife, who married him on March 22, 1976, on his 31st birthday. In August 1986, Larry was visited by journalists in prison for an interview, in which he spoke about being visited by his mother, sister and another woman with whom he had been in a relationship with for three years. He spoke impartially about his brother Danny, stating that they had not spoken to one another since the late 1960s. He claimed that, due to the severity of his brother's crimes, the family name became a personification of evil, and a main reason why he legally changed his name.

Larry additionally claimed to have made several unsuccessful attempts to commit suicide by hanging and by ingesting lacquer thinner and gelatin capsules, all of which occurred in the mid-1960s. In the early 1970s, he took up bodybuilding, but at one point stopped playing sports and refused to eat for 29 days, nearly dying from cachexia in the process.

He also stated that while serving his sentence, he earned a living through usury and social activities, sewing slippers and drawing. During the interview, Ranes stated that he had read many books, filling his educational gaps and developing his eloquence, for which he gained a reputation amongst other inmates as a skilled manipulator. According to his claims, during his 22 years in prison, he had a total of four affairs with four different women, two of which he began in prison. In the late 1970s, he faced disciplinary action after prison officials intercepted a conspiracy by eight inmates to kill another prisoner with a homemade crossbow, which was designed by Larry. Additionally, Ranes revealed that corruption was rampant in the prison, due to which he and a number of other inmates used to gain access to marijuana.

As of January 2022, the 76-year old Larry Ranes was alive and still serving his sentence in the Saginaw Correctional Facility. His brother, Danny Ranes, died of natural causes at Lakeland Correctional Facility in Coldwater, Michigan on January 29, 2022. He was 78-years-old. Danny's accomplice, Brent Koster, underwent many sex offender rehabilitation programs, earned a law degree and was an exemplary prisoner according to prison officials, who nonetheless had his parole applications consistently denied. In September 2020, at yet another parole hearing, the commission, taking into account his apparent remorse for the crimes and his young age when he committed them, finally approved his application, as he was considered unlikely to reoffend. After spending 48 years in prison, the 64-year-old Koster was released from the G. Robert Cotton Correctional Facility on January 21, 2021. He will be fully discharged from his sentence on January 21, 2025.

At his final parole hearing, Koster admitted there "was no doubt" that he deserved to spend the rest of his life in prison, agreeing with what the judge told him during his initial sentencing hearing nearly 50 years ago. However, he said he wanted a chance to contribute to society as a free citizen.

"I would like to be given the opportunity to serve the rest of my remaining days in a free community, rather than die in prison. I realize what I did. I realize that it is horribly wrong. But there are circumstances that got me involved in this and one of them is — I mean, I know it’s rare form to blame the co-defendant, but I was — well, shall we say, under the influence — not — I know what I did. I accept responsibility for that. But if it was not for my co-defendant, I would not be sitting here."

Koster gave a full admission of guilt. He said Danny had told him to assist him in strangling Clark and Bidstrup with rope. Koster also admitted that while Danny assisted him with killing Bidstrup, he killed Clark himself. "I was hesitant, but I’m knee-deep into this crime," he said at the hearing.

Koster expressed remorse for the murders, saying "It must have been horrible. I know that. I can’t even begin to realize the pain and suffering that they went through. The only thing I can compare it to is when I lost my father and my mother and the pain and hurt that I went through. But I can imagine it would nowhere compare to what the families went through."

A prison legal service supervisor for Koster and a prison legal service volunteer said she believed Koster was remorseful and ashamed of his participation in the murders. While acknowledging the horrific nature of his crimes, Jacqueline McKinnon said "but he is an adult now. He is not a 15-year-old. I have not seen any evidence whatsoever in the 19 years that I’ve known him that he is impulsive or a predator or anything but responsible and contrite and remorseful for his crimes."

In the media
 The 2016 book Luke Karamazov, written by Conrad Hilberry and Emanuel Tanay, was based on the crimes of the two brothers.
 The upcoming film He Went That Way, directed by Jeffrey Darling is inspired by the novel Luke Karamazov and based on the real-life account from celebrity animal trainer Dave Pitts who was the sole survivor of Larry's killing spree. The cast will include Zachary Quinto and Patrick J. Adams.

See also 
 List of homicides in Michigan
 List of serial killers in the United States

References

External links
 PEOPLE v. RANES
 Danny Ranes on MDOC
 Koster parole hearing

20th-century American criminals
American male criminals
American people convicted of murder
American prisoners sentenced to life imprisonment
American serial killers
Brothers
Criminal duos
Criminals from Michigan
Male serial killers
People convicted of murder by Michigan
People from Kalamazoo, Michigan
Prisoners sentenced to life imprisonment by Michigan
Suspected serial killers
Violence against women in the United States